Cambazlı is a village in Mersin Province, Turkey.

Geography

Cambazlı is a village in Silifke district of Mersin Province. It is situated in the plateau to the south of the Taurus Mountains. The population of Cambazlı is 729 as of 2011.

Cambazlı Ruins 

Canbazlı was an important settlement during the early Byzantine age. It is on the road connecting Uzuncaburç (Diocæsarea) to Kızkalesi (Corycus), both important ancient settlements.

References

External links 

Over 100 pictures of the church
Pictures of the monumental graves

Villages in Silifke District
Archaeological sites in Mersin Province, Turkey
Byzantine church buildings in Turkey